The 2014 United States Senate election in Mississippi was held on November 4, 2014, to elect a member of the United States Senate. Incumbent Republican Senator Thad Cochran, first elected in 1978, ran for re-election to a seventh term. Primary elections were held on June 3, 2014. 

The election was notable for the contentious Republican primary between Cochran and a Tea Party-backed challenger, Chris McDaniel. After neither Cochran nor McDaniel received 50% of the vote in the primary, a runoff election was held on June 24, 2014. After narrowly defeating McDaniel in the runoff, Cochran defeated Democratic nominee Travis Childers, a former congressman, with 60% of the vote.

Background 
Thad Cochran was first elected to the Senate with a plurality of the vote in a three-way race in 1978. He was reelected with at least 61% of the vote in 1984, 1990, 1996, 2002, and 2008.

Cochran was the last incumbent senator up for reelection in 2014 to declare whether he would run, causing widespread speculation that he would retire. Despite being urged to declare his intentions, Cochran said in August 2013, "I don't have a fixed date. But [I will decide] by the end of the year. You don't want to rush into these things." On November 12, he announced that he would reveal his plans by the end of the month. On December 6, he confirmed that he would run.

Cochran's fundraising ability, powerful Senate committee assignments, and very high approval ratings meant that he was considered "unbeatable". Mississippi Democratic Party Chairman Rickey Cole said that "in the very likely event that he does [run], we don't foresee a major Democratic challenger emerging." Had he chosen to retire, a "stampede" was predicted in the Republican primary and Democrats believed that a "properly positioned" candidate could have been competitive in the general election.

Republican primary 
The United States Senate Republican primary election in Mississippi took place on June 3, 2014. Incumbent Republican Senator Thad Cochran, who had served in the position since 1978, ran for reelection to a seventh term. He was challenged for the nomination by State Senator Chris McDaniel, a Tea Party supporter, and Thomas Carey. Cochran and McDaniel received 49.0% and 49.5% of the vote, respectively. Since no candidate won a majority, a June 24 runoff election ensued.

Cochran defeated McDaniel in the runoff, 51% to 49%. Controversially, Cochran's campaign invited Democrats to vote in the runoff, and Cochran-affiliated super PACs used racially charged themes in their primary ads, particularly the super-PAC All Citizens for Mississippi, which was funded (according to F.E.C. filings) by a super-PAC affiliated with former governor Haley Barbour.

Primary campaign 
Chris McDaniel declared his candidacy on October 17, 2013. He was immediately endorsed by the Club for Growth and Jim DeMint's Senate Conservatives Fund. McDaniel was initially thought to have no chance of beating Cochran in the primary, as summed up by the Jackson Free Press, who remarked that if McDaniel challenged Cochran, it would be the "beginning of [the] end of [his] political career". Republican lobbyist Henry Barbour, the nephew of former governor Haley Barbour, said: "I think he will get his head handed to him, and that will be what he deserves. [But] it's a free country." Rather, McDaniel was believed to have declared his candidacy in the hope that Cochran wouldn't run, so that he could get "first crack" at the support of Tea Party groups and donors ahead of a competitive primary.

Although the race was initially considered uncompetitive, McDaniel proved a serious challenger. Polling showed the lead swinging between the two and it eventually became a "50%-50% race".

The race was considered a marquee establishment-versus-Tea Party fight and significant because Mississippi is the poorest state and Cochran's seniority and appropriating skills contrasted with the junior status of the rest of the state's congressional delegation. McDaniel was endorsed by politicians including Sarah Palin and Rick Santorum and organizations including Citizens United, Club for Growth, FreedomWorks, Madison Project, National Association for Gun Rights, Senate Conservatives Fund and Tea Party Express. By contrast, the Republican establishment rallied around Cochran, who was endorsed by the National Rifle Association and National Right to Life.

The race was described as "nasty" and full of "bizarre" twists. McDaniel's campaign attacked Cochran for being "an out-of-touch, big-spending Washington insider" and Cochran's replied that "McDaniel's voting record in the state Senate does not match his conservative rhetoric." Each side accused the other of distortions and outright lies.

Cochran ran on his incumbency, seniority and the fact that he would become the Chairman of the Senate Appropriations Committee if the Republicans retook control of the Senate. In addition to ideological differences, the race also highlighted geographic divides in the state Republican Party.

Tea Party blogger scandal 
In May 2014, a scandal emerged when Clayton Thomas Kelly, a McDaniel supporter, allegedly entered a nursing home where Cochran's bedridden wife was living and took pictures of her. Kelly posted the images as part of a video on his blog, intending to advance the rumor that Cochran was having affairs while his wife was receiving care. Four people were arrested in connection with the incident. The connection to the McDaniel campaign was disputed. One of the arrested included McDaniel ally Mark Mayfield, who was vice chairman of the state's Tea Party. In response, McDaniel said, "the violation of the privacy of Mrs. Cochran [was] out of bounds for politics and reprehensible."

Race card scandal 

A second scandal emerged during the primary when racially charged pro-Cochran ads used such "code words" as "food stamps". Charges first surfaced that a small group of elderly Democratic women activists calling themselves Citizens for Progress were behind the controversy, but later facts as well as money trails show that money exchanged hands multiple times between Citizens for Progress and Mississippi Conservatives PAC.

After the fallout of the primary election, Missouri Republican Party chairman Ed Martin wrote an op-ed calling for the censure of Henry Barbour for his role in the funding of racially themed ads. He also called for Barbour's censure at an RNC summer meeting in Chicago.

Senator Ted Cruz appeared on the Mark Levin Show to discuss the Mississippi primary. He called for an investigation, saying, "the ads they ran were racially charged false attacks".

Primary election results 
The presence of a third candidate, Thomas Carey, opened the possibility that neither Cochran nor McDaniel would win a majority. Indeed, no candidate did, so a runoff between McDaniel and Cochran was required, and was held on June 24. The runoff was generally seen as advantageous to McDaniel.

After the election, the Hinds County Sheriff's Office announced it was investigating three McDaniel supporters who were locked inside the local courthouse, where primary ballots were held, on election night.

Runoff election 

The runoff was scheduled for June 24, three weeks after the primary. Despite trailing in most of the polls, Cochran won with 51% of the vote to McDaniel's 49%. McDaniel once again won big in his native Pine Belt and in the heavily populated suburban Memphis DeSoto County, but Cochran got a surge in votes from African Americans who took advantage of the mixed primary. Many credited Cochran's win to the increase in black voters. Cochran won by 3,532 votes in the most Democratic, African-American precincts in Hinds County (the state's largest county, and home to Jackson). These precincts made up nearly half of Cochran's margin of victory.

Endorsements

Democratic primary 
Former Congressman Travis Childers had stated that he was interested in running, particularly if Cochran retired. With Cochran facing a competitive primary, Childers announced in February 2014 that he was running. Childers won the Democratic primary with 74% of the vote.

Candidates

Declared 
 Travis Childers, former U.S. Representative
 William Bond Compton, Jr., candidate for Governor of Mississippi in 2007 and 2011
 Bill Marcy, former police officer and Republican nominee for the 2nd congressional district in 2010 and 2012
 Jonathan Rawl

Declined 
 David Baria, state representative
 Jim Hood, Mississippi Attorney General
 Bill Luckett, Mayor of Clarksdale and candidate for Governor in 2011
 Ray Mabus, United States Secretary of the Navy and former Governor of Mississippi
 Connie Moran, Mayor of Ocean Springs
 Ronnie Musgrove, former Governor of Mississippi and nominee for the U.S. Senate in 2008
 Brandon Presley, Commissioner for the Northern District of the Mississippi Public Service Commission
 Gene Taylor, former U.S. Representative
 Bennie Thompson, U.S. Representative

Results

General election

Campaign 

Childers described himself as a "moderate to conservative" Democrat, highlighting his vote against the Patient Protection and Affordable Care Act and his opposition to new gun-control measures, abortion and same-sex marriage.

Predictions

Polling 

With Cochran

With Hosemann

With McDaniel

Results 
On Election Day, Cochran defeated Childers, 59.90%-37.89%.

Aftermath
In the aftermath of the runoff, the McDaniel campaign claimed there were indications of voter fraud. A day after the election results were certified by the state party, Senator Ted Cruz and some Tea Party groups backed an investigation of supposed voter fraud in the runoff election. Cruz also told reporters that groups aligned with the Cochran campaign had run racially charged ads designed to persuade black voters to vote against McDaniel.

McDaniel's legal challenge to the election results failed.

See also 

 2014 United States Senate elections
 2014 United States elections

References

External links 
 U.S. Senate elections in Mississippi, 2014 at Ballotpedia
 Campaign contributions at OpenSecrets

2014
Mississippi
United States Senate